Nantou City (Mandarin Pīnyīn: Nántóu Shì; Hokkien POJ: Lâm-tâu-chhī) is a county-administered city located in the northwest of Nantou County, Taiwan. It lies between the Bagua Mountains and the Maoluo River and is the county seat of Nantou County. Freeway No. 3 serves Nantou City. Its name is a transliteration of the Hoanya word Ramtau with its first character ("south") chosen to complement that of Beitou's ("north"), a district in Taipei, even though there is no relation between the aboriginal names.

History

Qing Dynasty
The Han Chinese began arriving in the area during the reign of the Qianlong Emperor of Qing Dynasty. Members of the Zhang clan from Zhangzhou as well as the Jian, Lin and Xiao clans from Nanjing County in Zhangzhou were among the early settlers. A yamen was established in 1759 near the present Nantou Elementary School. In 1898, Nantou Commandery was organized.

Empire of Japan

In 1901, during Japanese rule,  was one of twenty local administrative offices established. In 1920, Nantō Town was governed under Nantō District, Taichū Prefecture.

Republic of China
After the handover of Taiwan from Japan to the Republic of China in 1945, Nantou County was organized out of Taichung County in 1950, and, in October of the same year, Nantou Township was organized with the county government seated in it. On 1 July 1957, the Taiwan Provincial Government moved to Zhongxing New Village, making Nantou the location of the provincial government. On 25 December 1981, Nantou became a county-administered city from the previous urban township. Due to its location along the Chelungpu Fault, Nantou was strongly affected by the 1999 Jiji earthquake: 92 people died and over 1,000 buildings were damaged

Economy 
Nantou City's economy is based on agriculture, tourism, and manufacturing. In 1965, the Nangang Industrial Zone (南崗工業區) was built to balance regional economic and industrial development.

Administrative divisions
Longquan, Kangshou, Sanmin, Renhe, Nantou, Zhangren, Chongwen, Sanxing, Sanhe, Jiaxing, Jiahe, Pinghe, Zhenxing, Qianqiu, Jungong, Tungshan, Yingnan, Yingbei, Neixing, Neixin, Guanghui, Guangrong, Guangming, Guanghua, Zhangxing, Zhanghe, Pingshan, Xinxing, Yongfeng, Fuxing, Fengshan, Yongxing, Fengming and Fushan Village.

Government institutions
 Taiwan Provincial Government
 Nantou County Government
 Nantou County Council

Tourist attractions
 Jufang Hall
 Nantou County Culture Park
 Nantou Peitian Temple
 Nantou Longquan Temple

Bus Stops

A bus station in the city is the Nantou Bus Station operated by Changhua Bus.

Notable natives
 Chang Chun-hung, member of Legislative Yuan (1993-2005)
 Hsu Shu-hua, Mayor of Nantou City (2006-2014)
 Hung Jui-chen, tennis player
 Sonia Sui, model and actress

References

External links

Nantou City Government Website 

County-administered cities of Taiwan
Populated places in Nantou County
Taiwan placenames originating from Formosan languages